Chuao is a small village located in the northern coastal range mountains of Venezuela, founded in 1660. The village is famous for its cacao plantations, Diablos danzantes and San Juaneras. The village is surrounded by mountains and dense rainforests to the south and the Caribbean Sea to the north. The nearby Henri Pittier National Park is the oldest national park in Venezuela, created in 1937. The village is only accessible by travelling via boat from nearby Choroní, and is approximately 4 kilometers inland.

Etymology 
Chuao's name derives from an indigenous word from a local language which is related to the term water.

History 
While cocoa production in the site of Chuao can be traced back to 1591, the town itself was founded in 1660. From 1591 onwards, the area was home to a number of haciendas which grew cocoa. During colonial times, a number of slaves were imported to the village from Africa to increase cocoa production on said haciendas.

Operation Gideon 

On May 3 and 4, 2020, Chuao was one of the sites of Operation Gideon, where a small group contracted by an American mercenary company Silvercorp USA headed by Jordan Goudreau allegedly attempted to invade Venezuela via sea to capture Nicolás Maduro and remove him from power. Upon landing in Chuao, the attackers, which included two Americans, were detained.

Economy 
The village of Chuao subsists largely on fishing and cocoa production.

Cocoa production 
Chuao is home to a number of cocoa plantations, dating back to 1591, which grow Criollo and hybrid varieties of cacao. Chuao beans are regarded as being high in quality and, as a result, very expensive, fetching between 9 and 13 US Dollars per kilogram. Beans from Chuao are considered some of Venezuela's finest, along with Porcelana Blanca beans from Lake Maracaibo. The Chuao region is hemmed in by mountains which reduces contact with people and insects from other areas. Some experts attribute the high quality of the cacao beans of Chuao due to the intense work of the village's laborers during the pre harvest, harvest and post harvest.Annual, Chuao's cocoa production hovers around 20 tons, but has varied from approximately 17 to 25 tons in recent years. In November 2000, the Chuao cacao beans were awarded an appellation of origin under the title Cacao de Chuao, allowing producers to negotiate higher prices and attract investment.

Empresa Campesina de Chuao 
The Farmer's Company of Chuao is the worker's cooperative which operates the cocoa plantations of Chuao. The cooperative has 127 members, most of whom are female.

The cooperative has sold their beans to a number of foreign firms, such as Valrhona and Amedei, before forming an exclusive partnership with Tisano, a Venezuelan partner, in 2014. As from 2020 Chuao Trading manages this partnership.  The partnership sells 99% of its cocoa to foreign buyers. The sales outside of Venezuela works via exclusive and authorised cacao importers for the markets in US, Japan and Europe. Through this partnership, the association "Empresa Campesia de Chuao", alongside their partners Chuao trading, Tachibana, Casa Fransesci and Silva Cacao, have implemented a Certificate of Authenthicity for the chocolatemakers to ensure that only the Chuao beans that were harvested in the Chuao village make it into chocolate bars that are marketed as Chuao origin. This traceability certificate assigns per sold volume and per harvest with a unique serial number to each chocolate maker.

The cooperative has benefitted largely from an increased global appetite for high-quality chocolate in recent years, which has helped its members earn a high standard of living. The worker's cooperative has been touted by the Venezuelan government as an "example of socialism". The cooperative has invested heavily in the village, building schools and medical infrastructure. However, The Guardian reported that those in Chuao who are not members of the association are discontent with power it has over village life.

Culture 
Central Venezuela is home to a unique tradition regarding the Corpus Christi celebration, in which young men and children partake in Los Diablos Danzantes, which depicts masked devils surrendering to a church official. The dancers who partake in this festival become members of a lifelong pact, known as the promise-keepers, to transmit their history and traditions to others. In 2012, this tradition was added to the UNESCO Representative List of the Intangible Cultural Heritage of Humanity.

The other column of the Chuao village are Las San Juaneras this is the group of ladies that take care of the beautiful church in the town square, lead most religious celebration specially the party of San Juan which is celebrated every year to thank San Juan for a good cacao harvest.

Gallery

References

External links

Populated places in Aragua
Port cities and towns in Venezuela
Tourist attractions in Aragua